Mr. Baseball is a 1992 American sports comedy film directed by Fred Schepisi, starring Tom Selleck, Ken Takakura, Dennis Haysbert, and Aya Takanashi. It depicts a tumultuous season in the career of veteran New York Yankees first baseman Jack Elliot, who is traded to the Chunichi Dragons of the Japanese Central League during Spring Training, and forced to contend with overwhelming expectations and cultural differences during the Dragons' run at the pennant.

Although the film was a limited success, it remains accurate, as of the 2020s, in portraying the peculiarities of Japanese baseball. It is used as a training resource by foreign professional baseball players who join a Japanese team.

Plot
Jack Elliot is an aging American baseball player unsuspectingly put on the trading block during Spring Training in 1992 by the New York Yankees in favor of "rookie phenom" first baseman Ricky Davis, and there's only one taker: the Nagoya Chunichi Dragons of Japan's Nippon Professional Baseball.

Upon arrival in Japan, Elliot clashes with the Japanese culture and the team's manager, and before long he alienates his new teammates. He believes the rules and management style of his new skipper, Uchiyama, are ludicrous, and continues to do things his way, which leads his already dwindling performance to suffer even more. His only ally on the team is another American ballplayer, Max "The Hammer" Dubois, with whom he commiserates about his frustrations. However, Max is a team player on the Dragons, and warns Elliot to be one too. At the same time, Elliot develops a relationship with the beautiful Hiroko, who he later learns is Uchiyama's daughter.

After one too many outbursts, including knocking out his interpreter during a brawl, Elliot is suspended from play. After meeting Hiroko's family, including Uchiyama, Uchiyama admits to Jack that he hired him over the objections of management and now his own career, not just Jack's, is in jeopardy. Dragons management wanted Pete Clifton from Boston, but Uchiyama pulled some strings with management to pick Jack because he was the right choice to turn the team around. After hearing this, Elliot swallows his pride and admits his deficiencies. Uchiyama becomes his mentor. Uchiyama lifts his suspension and begins to work with Elliot on improving his play. The reinvigorated Elliot's enthusiasm for team play is contagious and the mediocre Dragons become contenders for the Central League pennant. In the process, he also utilizes a Japanese tradition of being able to tell off Uchiyama while intoxicated to convince him to encourage his players to be more aggressive and "have a little fun."

Eventually, Elliot gets the opportunity to break Uchiyama's record of seven consecutive games with a home run, but not before his positive response to a call from his American agent complicates his relationship with Hiroko. His newfound respect for team play becomes apparent in a crucial game against the Yomiuri Giants. With the bases loaded, two outs and his team down 6–5, the team brass expects Uchiyama to signal for a bunt to try to tie the game, even though it would deny Elliot the chance to break the home run record. Elliot goes to Uchiyama and asks if he read the sign correctly. Uchiyama nods and tells him to swing away, knowing that a home run would break his record. Elliot takes a called strike one with a questionable call on the first pitch. Elliot fouls the second pitch back. Faced with a no-ball, two-strike count, Elliot sees the Giants' infield is playing deep and bunts. The Giants are caught off-guard and the bunt is successful in allowing the tying run to cross home plate. As the Giants struggle to field the ball, Elliot, approaching first base, veers slightly inside the baseline and knocks over the Giants' pitcher covering first on the play, which allows the winning run to score from second base.

With the Dragons winning the pennant, Uchiyama can keep his job and Max ends his five-year career in NPB by signing with the Los Angeles Dodgers. Elliot, who marries Hiroko, becomes a coach and mentor with the Detroit Tigers. The movie ends with one of the players calling him Chief, which is the same as he called Uchiyama in Japan.

Cast
Tom Selleck as Jack Elliot
Ken Takakura as Uchiyama
Aya Takanashi as Hiroko Uchiyama
Dennis Haysbert as Max "Hammer" Dubois
Toshi Shioya as Yoji Nishimura
 Mak Takano as Shinji Igarashi 
Nicholas Cascone as "Doc"
Kosuke Toyohara as Toshi Yamashita
Toshizo Fujiwara as Ryo Mukai
Charles Fick as Billy Stevens
Leon Lee as Lyle Massey
Bradley "Animal" Lesley as Alan Niven
Frank Thomas as Ricky Davis

Production

Screenplay
According to director Fred Schepisi, the original premise for Mr. Baseball — a baseball comedy that explored cultural differences between Japan and the United States—was conceived after the commercial success of the 1989 film Major League. The first story treatment was drafted by Theo Pelletier, a writer with no previous film credits to his name, and developed into a screenplay by Monte Merrick and Gary Ross. When Schepisi came onto the project, Tom Selleck had already been cast as the lead, and because of an unusual clause in his contract, had final say over the approval of the script. This resulted in the involvement of another screenwriter, Kevin Wade. Complicating matters further was the takeover of Universal Studios by Japanese conglomerate Matsushita (now known as Panasonic, which was previously a subsidiary of Matsushita). Universal was concerned about issues of cultural sensitivity in the depiction of Japanese characters, so they recruited John Junkerman, an experienced writer and director of films about Japan, to rework the story. Schepisi and a fourth screenwriter, Ed Solomon, traveled to Japan to do research. After returning from Japan, Schepisi and Solomon rewrote the entire script, highlighting cultural clashes between the characters for comic effect, but this version in turn was rewritten by Kevin Wade to accommodate Tom Selleck. Since Wade's contract expired mid-way through production, however, he only worked on it for about three weeks, leaving many loose ends that eventually had to be sorted out by Schepisi. In the end, the participation of many people in the process resulted in a screenplay that was much more conventional than Schepisi originally intended. In a later interview, he said he felt as though the film was not as good as it could have been:

Filming
Filming of Mr. Baseball took place primarily in Nagoya, with limited filming in Tokyo, Florida, and New York. Doug Claybourne, one of the producers, began preparation for location filming in Japan in 1991. Most scenes were filmed in the city of Nagoya, including a number that were eventually cut from the film. Most prominent are the scenes filmed at Nagoya Stadium, the former home of the Chunichi Dragons in Otobashi, Nagoya. Thousands of local extras volunteered to sit in the stands during the filming of game situations, even braving a typhoon to cheer on the fictionalized Dragons during their climactic showdown with the Yomiuri Giants.

Filming of other scenes did not range very far from the stadium. Two scenes of Jack Elliot and his interpreter Yoji (Toshi Shioya), were filmed on the Meitetsu Line shuttling between Nagoya Station and Kanayama Station. The scenes at Jack Elliot's suite apartment were filmed at the Tsukimi-ga-oka Mansion complex in Kakuozan, a thirty-minute subway and local train ride from the stadium.
Scenes of Jack and Hiroko's visit to local shrines were filmed at the Ōsu Kannon marketplace, near the heart of the city's commercial district. Sequentially, the scenes at Ōsu begin with Jack praying and clanging the bell at Fuji Sengen Shrine, before moving to Banshō-ji to offer incense. The building that housed Hiroko's "Concepts Graphic Designs" still stands in the Minami-yama/Hibari-ga-oka neighborhood of Nagoya, although the Minami-yama Pharmacy located next door has since changed locations to Irinaka. A scene in which Jack meets a group of other expatriate American ballplayers at a foreigners' bar was filmed in Sakae, on the site of the current Shooter's.

Only two scenes set in Japan were filmed outside of Nagoya:
 Jack's "Big Hit, Happy Body" commercial, filmed in a tea field overlooking Mikawa Bay.
 Jack's visits to the home of his manager, Uchiyama, which appear to have been filmed in the Komaki or Inuyama area.

Commenting on his working relationship with Selleck, Schepisi commented "He was extremely helpful getting the baseball thing right. Getting the American pride thing right."

Alternate scenes
Three scenes that were eventually cut from the North American release of the film (but retained in the Japanese release) were also filmed in Nagoya. All three scenes cast light on Jack's relationships with Uchiyama and Hiroko. These include:
 an exchange between Jack and Hiroko in Osu, in the arcade leading down to Bansho-ji Temple.
 an exchange between Jack and Hiroko in front of Tsukimi-ga-oka Mansion.
 a dialogue between Jack and Uchiyama (Ken Takakura) in the Heiwa Park cemetery.

Stadiums
Throughout the film, the Dragons play every team in the Japanese Central League except the Hanshin Tigers and Yakult Swallows (although Yoji quotes from an article from Chunichi Sports newspaper praising a leaping catch that Jack made to close the door against the Swallows). Nearly all are home games, filmed at Nagoya Baseball Stadium with extras in the stands. The only road game the Dragons play in the film is against the Hiroshima Toyo Carp, filmed on location at nearby Okazaki Stadium in Aichi Prefecture. The Yokohama Taiyo Whales were rebranded the Yokohama BayStars by the time the film premiered in Japan in February 1993.

The spring training baseball scene was filmed at Dedeaux Field on the campus of the University of Southern California.

Uniforms
All the uniforms, caps, and training gear featured in the film are authentic and current at the time of release. The Los Angeles Dodgers-inspired uniforms that the Chunichi Dragons players wear in the film—with the royal blue caps emblazoned with white "D" insignias in Casey font—are the same that the Dragons wore between 1987 and 1996. Oddly, the insignia on the Dragons cap is changed in the American theatrical release poster, emblazoned instead with a more angular "D" topped by a macron. The Dragons have never worn a cap like this.

The Detroit Tigers cap that Selleck wears in the last scene of the film, when he is coaching a rookie at the Tigers spring training facility, is the same cap he donned while playing the role of Thomas Magnum in the classic television series Magnum, P.I. Tom Selleck, who hails from Detroit, Michigan, is a lifelong Detroit Tigers fan and former minority shareholder of the team.

Models
While the movie is entirely fictitious, certain characters and scenes are based on real-life personalities and events. The character of Uchiyama, manager of the team, is very closely based on Senichi Hoshino, who managed the Dragons from 1987 to 1991 (he returned to manage the Dragons from 1996 to 2001). The scene in which Elliot taunts an opposing pitcher who refuses to throw him a strike by gripping the bat upside down was apparently based on a real-life incident. Western player Randy Bass, playing for the Hanshin Tigers who was challenging Japan's single-season home run record in 1985, also tauntingly turned his bat around in protest. The African American sidekick role, played by Dennis Haysbert, is believed to be based on the experiences of several African American players in Japan, including brothers Leron Lee and Leon Lee (who was a consultant on the film and has a cameo role).

Advisors
Many former players, baseball historians, and Japan experts served as advisors on the film, including former Lotte/Yokohama/Yakult slugger Leon Lee (who also makes a brief cameo in the film) and former MLB/Yakult Swallows player Doug DeCinces. Brad Lesley, another former American expat baseball player, has a small role in the film, as Alan Niven—playing a slugger rather than his natural position of relief pitcher.

Promotion
Universal released a theatrical trailer for Mr Baseball in the summer of 1992. The trailer, which runs two minutes and fourteen seconds, features dialogue and scenes that are absent from the final version of the film. For example, at the scene of Jack's first press conference, Yoji asks, "have you ever slept with Madonna?" During his first meeting with Uchiyama, Jack responds to the demand to shave his moustache by saying, "he probably can't even grow one." In the locker room scene where Jack is confused about how to use the Japanese-style toilet, he quips to Max, "I need somebody to tell me how to go to the can" (later changed in the final version of the film to "I need somebody to tell me how to take a crap"). The music in the trailer is mostly sampled from Jerry Goldsmith's soundtrack, but also includes samples from "Turning Japanese" by The Vapors. The song also appears in the MCA Universal Home Video promotional tape distributed to video rental shops in 1993. "Turning Japanese" did not appear in the final version of the soundtrack.

Reception

Critical reception
Upon its release, Mr. Baseball received mostly positive reviews from critics. Kevin Thomas of the Los Angeles Times wrote, "Mr. Baseball ... racks up a real home run for Tom Selleck.," comparing the actor to Clark Gable. Bill Diehl of ABC called Mr. Baseball "uproariously funny," while Steve Wille of Sports Illustrated glowed, "Tom Selleck deserves a baseball Oscar." Siskel and Ebert, in their review of the film, commented on its formulaic plot and lackluster writing, but also praised the film for its realistic crowd shots, direction, and Jerry Goldsmith's soundtrack. Janet Maslin of The New York Times singled out Selleck's performance for praise, writing, "The character of Jack, whose being sent to Japan is the impetus for Mr. Baseball, provides Mr. Selleck with something unusual: a movie role that actually suits his talents. Mr. Selleck's easygoing, self-deprecating manner works particularly well when he lets himself look silly, as he often does here." Mr. Baseball currently holds a 12% rating on Rotten Tomatoes based on 17 reviews — most of them written years after the film's release; conversely, audiences gave the film a 41% rating. Audiences polled by CinemaScore gave the film an average grade of "B+" on an A+ to F scale.

Box office
Mr. Baseball opened in 1,855 theaters on Friday, October 2, 1992. During its first weekend, it grossed over $5 million at the box office, coming in third behind The Last of the Mohicans and The Mighty Ducks. During its six-week run in theatres, it went on to gross $20.8 million domestically. Despite the limited marketability of baseball movies overseas, Universal positioned it for a wide distribution beyond the North American market. However, a disappointing showing in Japan and Europe prevented the studio from recouping on its enormous expenses. Mr. Baseball (ミスター・ベースボール) opened in theaters in Japan on February 6, 1993, and proceeded to gross a disappointing ¥1.5 billion ($1.25 million). By the end of its run in Japan, during the summer of 1993, it appeared as the "B film" in Universal double features—such as with the Robert Redford and River Phoenix film Sneakers (1992). Screenings in European theatres followed, but with little fanfare. It premiered in Germany on June 16, 1993.

Fan culture in Nagoya
Since 2011, an American fan dressed as Jack Elliot has garnered media attention for his enthusiastic support of the Chunichi Dragons, especially their minor-league affiliate, which plays in the old Nagoya Stadium — the setting of the film.

Home media
MCA Universal Home Video released Mr. Baseball on VHS in March, 1993. It was later reissued in 1997.

By professional players 
Mr. Baseball has found a niche audience in foreign professional baseball players who join a Japanese team. They use the film to prepare themselves for what they are about to experience. According to baseball players interviewed by The New York Times in 2022, the film still accurately portrays the pecularities of Japanese baseball.

See also
 Baseball in Japan

References

External links
 
 
 
 
 
 

1992 films
1992 comedy films
1990s American films
1990s English-language films
1990s Japanese-language films
1990s sports comedy films
American baseball films
American sports comedy films
Films about Major League Baseball
Films directed by Fred Schepisi
Films scored by Jerry Goldsmith
Films set in 1992
Films set in Nagoya
Films with screenplays by Gary Ross
Films with screenplays by Kevin Wade
Films shot in Japan
Japan in non-Japanese culture
Universal Pictures films